The 1907 North Tyrone by-election was held on 8 March 1907.  The by-election was held due to the incumbent Liberal MP, William Huston Dodd, being appointed as a Judge of the High Court of Justice in Ireland 1907–24.  It was narrowly won by the Liberal candidate Redmond Barry in a very high turnout.

Result

References

1907 elections in the United Kingdom
By-elections to the Parliament of the United Kingdom in County Tyrone constituencies
20th century in County Tyrone
1907 elections in Ireland